Wendy Lucero-Schayes (born June 26, 1963 in Denver, Colorado) is a retired female diver from the United States, who competed for her native country at the 1988 Summer Olympics.

A native of Denver, CO who attended Southern Illinois University, Lucero's aim was to compete in gymnastics, figure skating and diving. However, she started her gymnastics and figure skating at a more advanced age than would allow her to compete at the elite level,  so she focused on diving. Her father Don Lucero was the son of Spanish immigrants and her mother was of Irish descent.

In 1985 she transferred to the University of Nebraska where she won the NCAA one meter springboard diving title.  She competed in the 1988 Summer Olympics. She has won nine U.S. springboard titles, three U.S. Olympic Festival titles, and a World Championship silver medal. She was named Diver of the Year in 1990 and 1991. She claimed the silver medal at the 1991 World Aquatics Championships in the inaugural 1m Springboard event.

Lucero has worked as a sports broadcaster for ESPN, NBC and ABC. She is a member of the Colorado Sportswoman Hall of Fame. She is married to former NBA player Danny Schayes and is the daughter-in-law of Basketball Hall of Fame player Dolph Schayes.

References 

 sports-reference

Southern Illinois University alumni
1963 births
Living people
Olympic divers of the United States
Divers at the 1988 Summer Olympics
Sportspeople from Denver
American female divers
World Aquatics Championships medalists in diving
21st-century American women